The Arlington Masonic Temple, on S. Main Street in Arlington, South Dakota, was listed on the National Register of Historic Places in 2017.

It was built in 1907–1908.  It was designed by Huron, South Dakota architect George Issenhuth and built by contractor W.H. Eastman.

The building is used as the Arlington Community Museum.

References

National Register of Historic Places in South Dakota
Romanesque Revival architecture in South Dakota
Buildings and structures completed in 1908
Masonic buildings in South Dakota
Museums in Kingsbury County, South Dakota